The Battle of Daohuigu, was a battle that took place between the Mongol Empire and the Jin Dynasty in 1231 during the Mongol conquest of the Jin dynasty. This was one of the few instances where Subutai was defeated in battle although some sources claim the fault lied mainly due to Ögedei Khan's judgement and Subutai was merely a scapegoat.

Background

The Mongol Empire had suffered setbacks in its offensive against the Jin Dynasty after Ögedei Khan became head of the empire. In 1229, Mongol forces were defeated at the Battle of Dachangyuan and the siege of Qingyang city had to be lifted. The following year, Mongol forces were defeated again at the Battle of Weizhou. Both battles involved Jin general, Wanyan Chenheshang who commanded the Zhongxiao (Loyalty) army which consisted of various ethnic groups that were attacked by the Mongols. These included other Mongols, Naimans, Uyghurs, Tanguts, Han Chinese and even Kipchaks.

Ögedei was enraged by the news of defeats especially after Jin general, Yila Pua sent a message to him taunting him of their victory. Ögedei personally vowed to conquer the Jin and went to Yingzhou where for nine days he prayed to the Heavens for victory. He also called back Subutai from the Russian front to help on the campaign.

In 1231, Ögedei and his forces set out to move further south where they aimed to take the Jin capital, Kaifeng in Henan. Jin generals, Wanyan Heda and Yila Pua ordered troops to retreat from Shaanxi and implement a scorched earth policy to hold the fortified Tongguan Pass and block any access to Kaifeng. They calculated that the scorched earth policies would deny the Mongols the ability to sustain a lengthy siege, and their lines of fortifications and difficult terrain would prevent the Mongols from outmaneuvering them. Ögedei's forces had up to 100,000 men which included his brother Tolui as well as Subutai. With such a large army and the fact that Shaanxi was already suffering from a severe famine, Ögedei knew with limited time and resources, he had to find a way through Tongguan quickly.

Battle

Initial attempts to draw Jin forces out of fortress failed so Subutai decided to find a way to bypass Tongguan entirely.

Subutai was able to find a route by breaking through the small pass in the hills south of Tongguan. He then sacked the county towns of Lushi and Zhuyang (both in west Henan).

It looked like Subutai's forces had successfully outflanked Tongguan by passing through mountains but his troops were spread out far too wide over a very large distance. The regular Jin armies were unable to stop Subutai's forces from advancing however Wanyan Chenheshang arrived with 1,000 Zhongxiao troops as well as 10,000 regular troops. The cavalry forces of Chenheshang once again defeated the Mongols troops and drove them back. It was reported Subutai's forces suffered heavy losses during this battle.

Aftermath

Defeated at Tongguan, the Mongol armies turned to sieging Shaanxi’s major cities. They conquered Fengxiang by concentrating 400 trebuchets at a corner of the wall. However as the province had heavy famine, this did not help much with resupplying the large Mongol army and the main objective of getting past Tongguan was still not achieved. Seeing the difficult situation they were in, the Mongol commanders withdrew back to Inner Mongolia to come up with a new strategy while the army moved northwest to former the Jin-Xia borders to seek provisions and await orders.

Ögedei blamed Subutai for the defeat and berated him. However Tolui stepped in to defend Subutai stating: "For a military man, victory and defeat are unpredictable. Please allow him to establish merit and make this up himself."  It was noted from some sources that Ögedei would rather blame his generals than admit errors in his strategy. Ögedei was noted to have said during the siege of Fengxiang: "If Muqali were alive, I would not have had to come here myself!" 

This was the third and final victory achieved by the Jin Dynasty against the Mongol Empire due to Wanyan Chenheshang. However Jin fortunes came to an end in the following year at the Battle of Sanfengshan. This time thanks to the planning of Tolu, Subutai was able to outmaneuver Jin forces. As a result of the battle, the top generals, Wanyan Heda, Yila Pua and Wanyan Chenheshang all perished resulting in Jin having no more capacity to resist the Mongols.

References

Sources
 
 
 

Mongol conquest of Jin China
Battles involving the Mongol Empire
Conflicts in 1231
1231 in the Mongol Empire